Margherita Assembly constituency is one of the 126 assembly constituencies of  Assam a north east state of India.  Margherita is also part of Dibrugarh Lok Sabha constituency.

Members of Legislative Assembly
 1978: Kul Bahadur Chetri, Janata Party
 1983: Kul Bahadur Chetri, Indian National Congress
 1985: Kul Bahadur Chetri, Indian National Congress
 1991: Kul Bahadur Chetri, Indian National Congress
 1996: Tarun Gogoi, Indian National Congress
 1998 (by election): Pradyut Bordoloi, Indian National Congress
 2001: Pradyut Bordoloi, Indian National Congress
 2006: Pradyut Bordoloi, Indian National Congress
 2011: Pradyut Bordoloi, Indian National Congress
 2016: Bhaskar Sharma, Bharatiya Janata Party

Election results

2016 results

2011 results

See also
 Margherita
 Tinsukia district
 List of constituencies of Assam Legislative Assembly

References

External links 
 

Assembly constituencies of Assam
Tinsukia district